Monkstown Football Club is an Irish rugby club based in Dublin, playing in Division 1A of the Leinster League.

In addition to the First XV, they also have Second (J2), Third (J3) and Fourth (J4) XV's, a mini rugby section and a Golden Oldies team.

History
The club was founded in 1883 in Monkstown as the name suggests, but moved to the Sandymount area in 1901 after leasing grounds at Sydney Parade from the Earl of Pembroke.

They have always had a military connection, with British Army soldiers among the players. In fact, many of their players were casualties in the Boer War and the First World War, including internationals Ernest Deane, Basil Maclear and Pierce O'Brien-Butler. Since Irish independence many servicemen - soldiers, sailors as well as airmen - have turned out for the club and Leinster provincial teams. The Irish Defence Forces team regularly play their French counterparts at Sydney Parade.

Monkstown has hosted a number of international teams over the years, such as Australia, when they won the World Cup in 1991.

They have played in the Leinster League since 2003 and only narrowly failed to qualify for Division Three of the AIB League after winning the league in 2005/06.

International players
 Jasper Brett
 G. S. Brown
 Edward Fitzhardinge Campbell
 Maxwell Carpendale
 William John Cullen
 J. L. Davis
 Ernest Deane
 John Dowse
 James Blandford Ganly
 Thomas Arnold Harvey
 Basil Maclear
 R. H. Massy-Westropp
 Henry Millar
 Cecil Moriarty
 Pierce O'Brien-Butler
 James Cecil Parke
 Daniel Frederick Rambaut
 Frederick Smithwick
 G. R. Symes
 Robin Wright

Officials
 Henry Millar, President of the IRFU 1928/29
 Capt. J. R. Ramsey, President of the IRFU 1956/57
 Robert Ganly, President of the IRFU 1980/81
 Ken Mills, President of the Leinster Branch IRFU 1986/87
 Brian Brady, President of the Leinster Branch IRFU 2005/06
 Jerome "Jerry" Counihan, President of the ARLB 2009/2010
 Donal Courtney, International Referee

Honours

 Leinster Club Senior Cup: 1899, 1902
 AIB League Division Three: 1995/96
 Leinster League: 2005/06

References
Monkstown FC
Irish Rugby : Former Presidents 1874-1949
Irish Rugby : Ex-Presidents of the IRFU 1950-Present
Leinster Rugby : Past Presidents

 
Irish rugby union teams
Rugby union clubs in Dún Laoghaire–Rathdown
Rugby clubs established in 1883
Rugby union clubs in Dublin (city)